The 2015 Kobe Challenger was a professional tennis tournament played on indoor hard courts. It was the 1st edition of the tournament which was part of the 2015 ATP Challenger Tour. It took place in Kobe, Japan between 9 and 15 November 2015.

Singles main-draw entrants

Seeds

 1 Rankings are as of November 2, 2015.

Other entrants
The following players received wildcards into the singles main draw:
  Sho Katayama
  Yuya Kibi
  Ken Onishi

The following players received entry from the qualifying draw:
  Andriej Kapaś 
  Young Seok Kim
  Christopher Rungkat 
  Kento Takeuchi

The following players entered as lucky losers:
  Yūichi Ito
  Makoto Ochi
  Masato Shiga

Champions

Singles

 John Millman def.  Taro Daniel 6–1, 6–3

Doubles

 Sanchai Ratiwatana /  Sonchat Ratiwatana def.  Chen Ti /  Franko Škugor 6–4, 2–6, [11–9]

External links
Official Website

Kobe Challenger
Kobe Challenger
2015 in Japanese tennis